The Akwa Ibom State Ministry of Information and Strategy is the state government's ministry, charged with the responsibility to plan, devise and implement the state policies on Information and Strategy.

History 

The Akwa Ibom state Ministry of Information and Strategy was established in September 1987, with Mr Moses Ekpo as its Pioneer Commissioner. Mr Moses Ekpo is the sitting Deputy Governor.

References 

Government ministries of Akwa Ibom State